I'm a Celebrity...Get Me Out of Here! returned for its eleventh series on 13 November 2011. Ant & Dec returned as presenters for the main show and its spin off show Get Me Out of Here NOW! returned with new hosts Laura Whitmore, Russell Kane and Joe Swash as presenters.

On 3 December 2011, Dougie Poynter was crowned the new King of the Jungle. Ant & Dec announced on the Coming Out show that I'm a Celebrity... would return for its 12th series in 2012.

Celebrities
The official line-up was confirmed on 8 November 2011. The day before the show started, it was reported that Freddie Starr had not entered the jungle with the other celebrities. On Day 3, TV presenter Pat Sharp and singer Sinitta were confirmed to be entering the jungle. Model and DJ Emily Scott entered the jungle on Day 5.

On 20 November 2011, Neighbours actor Ian Smith joined the jungle to set the campmates on a series of challenges called "Beat the Bugs" over three days.

On 10 November 2011, it was confirmed by ITV that Peter Andre would be returning to camp for one day to set the remaining campmates tasks to win treats.

Results and elimination
 Indicates that the celebrity was immune from the vote
 Indicates that the celebrity received the most votes from the public
 Indicates that the celebrity received the fewest votes and was eliminated immediately (no bottom two)
 Indicates that the celebrity was named as being in the bottom two
 Indicates that the celebrity received the second fewest votes and were not named in the bottom two

Notes
N.B. Bottom two is not a strict indication of the public vote as the celebrities are revealed in "no particular order".
 In order to win immunity from the first public vote, all the celebrities took part in a task called "Beat the Bugs". The losing team from each round would then go to the Sin Bin (located in camp), all the celebrities then had to face a "Bed Bugs" challenge and the team which lost would face the first public vote.
 All of the celebrities faced the public vote; the bottom two were revealed as Fatima and Pat. The other celebrities were declared safe and on Day 14 both Fatima and Pat faced a bush tucker trial called "Fill Your Face: Extreme". Fatima won the trial and returned to camp, while Pat was sent home.
 The public were voting for who they wanted to win instead of who they wanted to save.

Bushtucker trials
The contestants take part in daily trials to earn food

 The public vote for who they want to face the trial
 The contestants decide who does which trial
 The trial is compulsory and neither the public nor celebrities decide who take part

Notes
 The celebrities were split up into two teams, based on how they travelled into the jungle. The winning team would stay in "Croc Creek", the more luxurious of the two camps in the jungle. The losing team would move into the "Snake Rock" camp.
 Freddie was excluded from this trial on medical grounds.
 As they had yet to join one of the camps, Pat and Sinitta were both ineligible for this trial.
 As Emily arrived in the jungle after Sinitta had completed her trial, the celebrities were awarded an extra star to help feed an extra body
 As a new campmate, Emily was ineligible for this trial.
 Sinitta was excluded from this trial on medical grounds.
 This trial decided who left camp. The winner (Fatima) returned to camp while the loser (Pat) left the jungle.

Star count

Celebrity Chest challenges

 The celebrities got the question correct
 The celebrities got the question wrong
Bold type means that contestant won the challenge (episodes 2 to 4)

The camps
For the first four days of the show, the celebrities were split between two separate camps known as "Croc Creek" and "Snake Rock". The result of the first Bushtucker Trial determined which pre-determined team got to stay in Croc Creek - a larger and slightly more luxurious camp. The original members of each camp were:

Croc Creek: Antony, Crissy, Fatima, Lorraine and Mark.
Snake Rock: Dougie, Freddie, Jessica-Jane, Stefanie and Willie.

After their arrival in the jungle, Pat was sent to join Croc Creek, while Sinitta joined Snake Rock. The two camps merged in the early hours of Day 5, with the residents of Snake Rock relocating to the larger Croc Creek camp.

Emily joined the larger Croc Creek camp on Day 5.

Episodes

Week 1

Week 2

Week 3

After the Jungle

Ratings
Official ratings are taken from the Broadcasters' Audience Research Board. All viewing figures are in millions and does not include ITV HD. The coming out show is not added into the series average, as it is an extra show shown after the series has ended. There were no shows on 15 or 23 November due to live football being shown, however, the ITV2 show still aired as normal.

References

External links 
 

2011 British television seasons
11